OFK Petrovac is a football club based in Petrovac, Montenegro. They currently compete in the First League of Montenegro.

History
OFK Petrovac was founded in 1969, under the name FK Nafta. During the first season, they played in the lowest-tier competition - Fourth League - South. At season 1971-72, FK Nafta became a runner-up in Fourth League championship, which gained them promotion to Montenegrin Republic League.
From 1972 until the end of the century, most of the seasons, OFK Petrovac played in Montenegrin Republic League, with few relegations and comebacks from lower rank. Among the historical seasons in the club's history was 2000-01. As a second-placed team in Montenegrin Republic League, OFK Petrovac gained promotion to Yugoslav Second League. They played five consecutive seasons in Second League, until the split of Serbia and Montenegro Federation.
After Montenegrin independence, OFK Petrovac was among 12 teams which are chosen to play in the first season of Montenegrin First League (2006–07).
Historical success in club's history, OFK Petrovac made at season 2008-09. They won the trophy of winner of the Montenegrin Cup, after extra-time final game against FK Lovćen in Podgorica (1-0). With the Cup trophy, OFK Petrovac gained participation in UEFA Europa League in season 2009–10. On their European debut, OFK Petrovac won against Anorthosis Famagusta, but were eliminated in the third leg against Sturm Graz.
OFK Petrovac played another final of the Montenegrin Cup on season 2014-15, but this time were defeated in extra time by Mladost (1-2).
Since 2006, OFK Petrovac played all the seasons of Montenegrin First League, without any relegation. Best placement, team from Petrovac made at seasons 2011–12 and 2013–14, finishing as a fifth-placed team.

First League Record

For the first time, OFK Petrovac played in Montenegrin First League on season 2006–07. Below is a list of OFK Petrovac scores in First League by every single season.

OFK Petrovac in European competitions

For the first time, OFK Petrovac played in European competitions at season 2009–10. Until now, they played one season in European Cups.

Honours
 Montenegrin Cup – 1
Winners (1): 2008–09
Runners-up (1): 2014–15

Players

Current squad

Notable players
For the list of former and current players with Wikipedia article, please see :Category:OFK Petrovac players.
Below is the list of most-known players which, during their career, played for OFK Petrovac.
 Zoran Đurašković
 Miodrag Zec
 Slaven Kovačević
 Vladimir Vujović
 Toni Meglenski
 Pedro Velázquez
 Gerson Barrientos

Managerial history

 Milorad Malovrazić (Jun 2006 – Mar 2008)
 Obren Sarić (21 Mar 2008 – Oct 2008)
 Aleksandar Miljenović (20 Oct 2008 – Jun 2009)
 Milan Vranes (Jul 2009 – Dec 2009)
 Milovan Minja Prelević (Dec 2009)
 Milorad Malovrazić (25 Dec 2009 – May 2010)
 Dejan Mrvaljević (Jun 2010 – Aug 2010)
 Dragoljub Đuretić (Sep 2010)
 Milorad Malovrazić (1 Oct 2010 – Mar 2016)
 Ivan Brnović (14 Mar 2016 – Jun 2016)
 Aleksandar Nedović (17 Jun 2016 – May 2017)
 Rudolf Marčić (May 2017 – Aug 2019)
 Željko Mrvaljević (Aug 2019)
 Nenad Vukčević (23 Sep 2019 – 29 Aug 2021)
 Vladimir Janković (1 Sep 2021 – 25 Feb 2022)
 Nikola Rakojević (2 Mar 2022 – present)

Stadium

OFK Petrovac plays its home games at Stadion Mitar Mićo Goliš, whose capacity is 1,630 seats. Stadium is built near the coast of Adriatic Sea. It was reconstructed during the 2013 and now is eligible for UEFA international matches.
The stadium has two all-seated stands, floodlights and other facilities.

See also
Petrovac
Montenegrin First League
Montenegrin clubs in Yugoslav football competitions (1946–2006)

References

External links
Official website

 
Sport in Budva
Association football clubs established in 1969
Football clubs in Montenegro
1969 establishments in Montenegro